Acrataula is a genus of moths of the family Yponomeutidae.

Species 
 Acrataula catapachna - Meyrick, 1921 

Yponomeutidae